An ambalama (Sinhala: අම්බලම) is a place constructed for pilgrims, traders and travellers to rest in Sri Lanka. This is a simple structure designed to provide shelter for the travellers. The last examples of anbalange remained until about the end of the 1970s. There were no charges involved in using an Ambalama.

History 
According to Anuradha Seneviratna and Benjamin Polk pilgrimage rest-houses like Ambalamas were well established before 230 BC as Mauryan kings issued orders carved on stones or iron columns for planting of avenues of trees and for building shelters for the comfort of pilgrims. Ambalamas in Sri Lanka, many of them several centuries old, have been kept close to their youth by the continuous replacements of decaying parts and are among the oldest wood structures in Sri Lanka. Prominent families of a locality donate and maintain a shelter, or they are put up by the villagers as a place to rest and meet.

In literature
In Salalihini and Gira sandeshas, there are references to Ambalamas.

Prominent Ambalamas

 Appallagoda Ambalama
 Giruwa Ambalama
 Kadugannawa Ambalama
 Panavitiya Ambalama
 Pita Kotte Gal Ambalama
 Karagahagedara Ambalama
 Padiwita Ambalama
 Marassana Ambalama
 Awariyawala Ambalama
 Godamunne Ambalama
 Kandewela Ambalama
 Hewawissa Ambalama
 Karalliyadda Ambalama
 Udunuwara Pitawala (Pallepitawala) Ambalama
 Patha Hewaheta Elikewala Ambalama

See also
 Flophouse

References

External links
 Ambalamas in Sri Lanka (in Sinhala)

Architecture in Sri Lanka